Iosefa Maposua  (born 2 February 1977)  is an association footballer from Samoa. He plays as a defender and has played for three clubs as well as the Samoa national football team.

Club career

Maposua began his career at Samoan club Titavi FC in 2001. He only spent a year at the club before moving on in 2002 to play for another Samoan club, Kiwi FC. After playing for Kiwi in the 2002–03 season, Iosefa moved to American Samoa to play for PanSa East FC, the country's most successful club. Prior to the defender's arrival PanSa had won three consecutive ASFA Soccer League titles, but their only triumph during Maposua's time at the club is the 2005 ASFA Soccer League.

International career

Iosefa made his debut for Samoa in a 2002 FIFA World Cup qualifier against Australia played at Coffs Harbour on 16 April 2001. Samoa lost the game 11–0. This appearance remained the player's only cap until 2004, when he was called up for four 2006 FIFA World Cup qualifiers played in Apia, Samoa. Maposua played his final game for Samoa on 19 May 2004 in the 4–1 loss to Papua New Guinea.

References

Living people
1977 births
Samoan footballers
Samoan expatriate footballers
PanSa East FC players
Expatriate footballers in American Samoa
Association football defenders
Samoan expatriates in American Samoa
Samoa international footballers